Chakhar is a variety of Mongolian spoken in the central region of Inner Mongolia. It is phonologically close to Khalkha and is the basis for the standard pronunciation of Mongolian in Inner Mongolia.

Location and classification 
There are three different definitions of the word Chakhar. First, there is Chakhar proper, spoken in Xilingol League in the banners of Plain Blue Banner, Plain Bordered White Banner, Bordered Yellow Banner, Tayipusė in Dolonnuur and in the Ulanqab region in Chakhar Right Rear Banner, Chakhar Right Middle Banner, Chakhar Right Front Banner, Šaŋdu and Quvadė, with a number of approximately 100,000 speakers.

In a broader definition, the Chakhar group contains the varieties Chakhar proper, Urat, Darkhan, Muumingan, Dörben Küüket, Keshigten of Ulanqab. In a very broad and controversial definition, it also contains the dialects of Xilingol League such as Üjümchin, Sönit, Abaga, and Shilinhot. The Southern Mongolian normative pronunciation is based on the variety of Chakhar proper as spoken in the Shuluun Köke banner.

Phonology 
Excluding the phonology of recent loanwords, Chakhar has the pharyngeal vowel phonemes  and the non-pharyngeal vowel phonemes  that adhere to vowel harmony. All have long counterparts and some diphthongs exist as well.  has phoneme status only due to its occurrence as word-initial vowel in words like  'to win' (vs.  'to kill'), thus  (<*i) does occur in pharyngeal words as well. Through lexical diffusion,  <*e is to be observed in some words such as  < *ene ‘this’, rather than in  'kite (bird)'. However, long monophthong vowels also include  < *ei. The maximal syllable structure is CVCC. In word-final position, non-phonemic vowels often appear after aspirated and sometimes after unaspirated consonants. They are more frequent in male speech and almost totally disappear in compounds. The consonant phonemes (again excluding loanwords) are

Palatalized vowels have phoneme status only in pharyngeal words.

Word classes and morphology 
The case system of Chakhar has the same number of morphemes as Khalkha with approximately the same forms. There is a peculiar Allative case suffix, that has developed from *ödö (Mongolian script <ödege>) 'upwards' and that seems to be a free allomorph of the common . The reflexive-possessive suffixes retain their final  (thus <*-ban etc., while Khalkha has ).

Large numbers are counted according to the Chinese counting system in powers of 10.000. Collective numerals can be combined with approximative numeral suffixes. So while  'about ten' and  'as a group of ten' a common in Mongolian,  'as a group of about ten' seems to be peculiar to Chakhar.

The pronominal system is much like that of Khalkha. The 3. person stems don't employ any oblique stems. The 1. person plural exclusive man- has an almost complete case paradigm only excluding the nominative, while at least in written Khalkha anything but the genitive form <manai> is rare.

Chakhar has approximately the same participles as Khalkha, but -mar expresses potentiality, not desire, and consequently -xar functions as its free allomorph. On the other hand, there are some distinctive converbs such as -ba (from Chinese 吧 ba) 'if' and -ja (from 也 yè) 'although' which seem to be allomorphs of the suffixes -bal and -bt͡ʃ of common Mongolian origin. The finite suffix -la might have acquired converbal status. Finally,  ('if ... then ...') has turned into , and the form -man ~ - 'only if', which is absent in Khalkha, sometimes occurs.

Lexicon
Most loanwords peculiar to the Chakhar dialect are from Chinese and Manchu.

Notes

References

Bibliography 

 Ashimura, Takashi (2002): Mongorugo jarōto gengo no  no yōhō ni tsuite. In: Tōkyō daigaku gengogaku ronshū 21: 147-200.
 Janhunen, Juha (2003): Mongol dialects. In: Juha Janhunen (ed.): The Mongolic languages. London: Routledge: 177–191.
 Köke and Sodubaγatur (1996): Čaqar aman ayalγun-u üge-yin ečüs-ün boγuni egesig-ün tuqai. In: Öbür mongγul-un yeke surγaγuli 1996/3: 9-20.
 Mongγul kelen-ü barimǰiy-a abiyan-u kiri kem-i silγaqu kötülbüri nayiraγulqu doγuyilang (2003): Mongγul kelen-ü barimǰiy-a abiyan-u kiri kem-i silγaqu kötülbüri. Kökeqota: Öbür mongγul-un arad-un keblel-ün qoriy-a.
 Norčin (2001): Barim/ǰiy-a abiy-a - Čaqar aman ayalγu. Kökeqota: öbür mongγul-un arad-un keblel-ün qoriy-a.
 Önörbajan, C. (2004): Orčin cagijn  helnij üg züj. Ulaanbaatar: Mongol ulsyn bolovsrolyn ih surguul'.
 Poppe, Nicholaus (1951): Khalkha-mongolische Grammatik. Wiesbaden: Franz Steiner.
 [Sečenbaγatur] Sechenbaatar (2003): The Chakhar dialect of Mongol - A morphological description. Helsinki: Finno-Ugrian society.
 Sečenbaγatur et al. (2005): Mongγul kelen-ü nutuγ-un ayalγun-u sinǰilel-ün uduridqal. Kökeqota: Öbür mongγul-un arad-un keblel-ün qoriy-a.
 Svantesson, Jan-Olof, Anna Tsendina, Anastasia Karlsson, Vivan Franzén (2005): The Phonology of Mongolian. New York: Oxford University Press.

Agglutinative languages
 Mongolic languages
Central Mongolic languages